Caladenia saxicola, commonly known as the banded ironstone spider orchid is a plant in the orchid family Orchidaceae and is endemic to the south-west of Western Australia. It has a single erect, hairy leaf and one or two dull creamy-white to pale yellow flowers with spreading lateral sepals and petals.

Description
Caladenia saxicola is a terrestrial, perennial, deciduous, herb with an underground tuber. It is sometimes found as a solitary plant or otherwise in small clumps. The flowers are dull creamy-white to pale yellow with dark red lines and blotches. The sepals and petals are linear to lance-shaped near their base, then suddenly narrow to a purplish-black, thread-like tip covered with glandular hairs. Flowering occurs from late July to early September.

Taxonomy and naming
Caladenia saxicola was first formally described by Andrew Brown and Garry Brockman in 2007 from a specimen collected near Coolgardie. The description was published in Nuytsia. The specific epithet (saxicola) is derived from the Latin word saxum meaning "rock" and the suffix -cola meaning "dweller in" referring to the rocky habitat where this species grows.

Distribution and habitat
The banded ironstone spider orchid is found between Canna and Diemals in the Coolgardie and Yalgoo biogeographic regions where it mostly grows in seasonally moist soils on banded ironstone hills.

Conservation
Caladenia saxicola is classified as "not threatened" by the Western Australian Government Department of Parks and Wildlife.

References

saxicola
Endemic orchids of Australia
Orchids of Western Australia
Plants described in 2007
Taxa named by Andrew Phillip Brown